The 2020–2022 Ethiopian–Sudanese clashes was a conflict between Sudan and Ethiopia, together with Amhara militants and Eritrea, in the disputed border region of al-Fashaga (an area of Sudan east of the Atbarah River and south of the Tekezé River). Since 2008, Ethiopia has dropped all claims to the al-Fashaga as long as Sudan allowed Ethiopian farmers and militants to stay in the area undisturbed. With the outbreak of the Tigray War, Sudanese forces were able to move into the region due to an agreement with Ethiopia just three days before. When Amhara militants left to assist the federal government in the war, Sudanese forces started to drive out Ethiopian farmers, including the Amhara, effectively breaking the 2008 compromise. Ethiopia has also accused Sudan of killing Amhara farmers.

The clashes first began in the Abu Tyour area, along the Ethiopia–Sudan border, on 15 December 2020, when Amhara militants allegedly backed by the Ethiopian government ambushed several Sudanese military officers, killing four of them. Since then, Sudan has recaptured most of the disputed border. Despite it still being legally Sudanese territory, the Amhara Region government has called Sudanese deployment an invasion and has said that al-Fashaga belonged to Amhara Region. Abiy Ahmed has made statements supporting that claim. Due to Sudan driving out the Amhara militants, Sudanese farmers have begun to cultivate their land for the first time in twenty-five years. Amhara militants have also been killing Sudanese farmers.

Background
In 1902, British-ruled Sudan and the Ethiopian Empire signed a treaty to properly demarcate the border, but it failed, as some areas along the border were left unresolved. In both the 1902 and a later 1907 treaty, the international boundary runs to the east, which means the land of al-Fashaga is Sudanese but Ethiopians had already settled the area and had been cultivating there, along with paying taxes to the Ethiopian government.

After the Eritrean–Ethiopian War, Ethiopia and Sudan began long-dormant talks to settle the exact location of their 744 km-long (462 miles) border, with the most difficult area to agree on being the al-Fashaga region.

In 2008, they reached a compromise. Ethiopia agreed to the al-Fashaga region being a part of Sudan but Amhara farmers would still be allowed to continue living there undisturbed. Tigrayan farmers in the northern regions of al-Fashaga were also allowed to stay.

Once the Tigray People's Liberation Front (TPLF) was removed from power in 2018, Amhara Region-leaders, whose sub-national territory al-Fashaga is located in, condemned the deal as a secret bargain and said they were not properly consulted when the deal was made.

Prelude
At the start of the Tigray War, the head of Sudan's ruling Sovereign Council, Lt. General Abdel Fattah, dispatched over 6,000 soldiers to the Ethiopian border as part of an agreement reached with Ethiopia on 1 November 2020 to prevent Tigrayan rebels from using Sudan as a supply route. With Sudanese troops finally being deployed to the border, the 2008 compromise was practically dissolved, and once Amhara militants were re-deployed to Tigray to help the federal government, Sudanese soldiers began removing potentially thousands of Amhara and Tigrayan farmers from the region. Complicating matters further was a rapid exodus of refugees fleeing to Sudan from the Tigray Region's Western Zone, many of them attempting to escape the wartime violence. The number of refugees increased from around 7,000 on 11 November to almost 44,000 by the end of the month.

Sudanese troops made rapid progress in consolidating their hold on the disputed territory. On 2 December, the Sudanese Armed Forces occupied the Khor Yabis area, controlled by Ethiopia for twenty-five years, expelling Ethiopian militants without a fight. Three days later, Sudan deployed the Sixth Infantry Division to al-Fashaga to take control of Jebel Tayara, in Gallabat. Sudan also continued to penetrate deeper into al-Fashaga by the second week of December.

Clashes

2020
On 15 December, Ethiopian militants, allegedly backed by the Ethiopian government, ambushed several Sudanese troops, killing an officer and three soldiers. Later that day, the Sudanese Prime Minister, Abdalla Hamdok, said that the armed forces of Sudan were prepared to repel the military aggression. Already dealing with a war in the north, Ethiopian Prime Minister Abiy Ahmed tried to calm the situation by tweeting, "Such incidents will not break the bond b/n our two countries as we always use dialogue to resolve issues."

Tensions increased when Sudan started mobilising soldiers to the contested border and by New Year's day, it claimed to have recaptured all villages in the region. In response, Ethiopian military chief General Birhanu Jula Gelalcha said, "Our military is engaged elsewhere, they took advantage of that. This should have been solved amicably. Sudan needs to choose dialogue, as there are third party actors who want to see our countries divided."

On 28 December, Sudan claimed to have captured the villages of Asmaro, Lebbaki, Pasha, Lamlam, Melkamo, Males, Ashkar, Arqa, and Umm Pasha Teddy. In total, it captured eleven settlements that Ethiopian militias had been controlling. Sudan also claimed to have captured the town of Lilli from Amhara forces and militias. Lilli is home to Amhara militia commanders, major traders and farmers. In total, over a thousand Ethiopian farmers live there.

2021
On 3 January, Sudan captured 45 Amhara militiamen who had crossed into Sudan.

Subsequently, Ethiopian militiamen kidnapped three Sudanese merchants from the Basanda area of El-Gadarif state on 30 January, after penetrating seven kilometres inside Sudanese territory, and set their motorcycle on fire. The Sudanese military deployed additional reinforcements after the kidnapping. Armed relatives of the abductees tried to enter the Ethiopian town of Metemma but were persuaded to withdraw. The merchants were later released after payment of a ransom.

On 14 February, Sudan said Ethiopian soldiers crossed into its territory. The Ethiopian Ministry of Foreign Affairs said that Sudan had been plundering and displacing Ethiopian citizens since 6 November 2020 and that the Sudanese army should evacuate the area that it had forcefully occupied. Ethiopia also accused Sudan of crossing into its territory.

On 20 February, the Sudanese Ministry of Foreign Affairs claimed that Eritrean forces had entered into the al-Fashaga region with Ethiopian forces. Four days later, on 24 February, Eritrea denied the involvement of its forces in the tensions on the Sudanese-Ethiopian border, stating that it wished for a peaceful solution to the conflict and that the government understood Sudan's position regarding its right to extend its sovereignty.

On 23 February, Ethiopia asked Sudan to withdraw its troops from the disputed border area before peace talks could begin. The Ethiopian Ministry of Foreign Affairs spokesperson, Dina Mufti, said that Ethiopia did not want to enter into conflict with Sudan again. He also said that Ethiopia wished to return to the 2008 compromise, which would allow Ethiopian troops and civilians to enter the region undisturbed. Finally, Mufti said there was a third party who pushed Sudan to enter into conflict with Ethiopia. The same day, Sudan stated that it would not withdraw its troops from the border region and that the deployment of the Sudanese army on the border strip with Ethiopia was a final and irreversible decision.

On 2 March, the Sudanese army continued to push into the last Ethiopian stronghold of Bereket in the disputed border region of al-Fashaga, against Ethiopian-backed forces. In the meantime, Sudan claimed Eritrean forces were helping the Ethiopians.

Sudan closed the Gallabat-Metemma border crossing with Ethiopia on 3 April, two days after Ethiopian militias attacked Sudanese customs officials in the presence of the Ethiopian military. Walid Ahmad al-Sajjan, commander of the Fifth Brigade of the Sudanese Armed Forces in Umm Barakit, stated on 8 April that the Sudanese military had retaken 95% of the disputed al-Fashaga region from Ethiopia.

On 13 April, Sudan released 61 Ethiopian soldiers it had captured and handed them to the Ethiopian government through the Gallabat border crossing.

Three children of the Fellata tribe were kidnapped by Ethiopian militias from an area near Gallabat and Metemma on 23 July. Sudanese captain Bahaa El-Din Youssef, commander of the Gallabat Military Region, was captured and later tortured while pursuing the militia behind the kidnapping. Meanwhile, the military buildup continued on the border and Sudan closed the Gallabat border crossing with Ethiopia on 24 July.

Sudan's military stated on 26 September that Ethiopian forces had tried to capture the Umm Barakit area a day earlier but were forced to withdraw after being confronted.

On 27 November 2021, six Sudanese soldiers were killed in an attack by Ethiopian forces on a Sudanese army post near the border between the countries, Sudanese military sources told Reuters. Sudan's army said in an earlier statement on Facebook that "groups of the Ethiopian army and militias attacked its forces in Al-Fashaga Al-sughra, which resulted in deaths... our forces valiantly repelled the attack and inflicted heavy losses in lives and equipment on the attackers."

On 15 December 2021, the Sudanese forces announced full control over the disputed region.

2022
On 24 August 2022, the Ethiopian Air Force shot down a plane carrying weapons that they suspected to be destined for the Tigray People's Liberation Front. According to senior officials, the EAF shot it down while it was crossing the Ethiopia–Sudan border. Major General Tesfaye Ayelew, quoted by the Ethiopian News Agency, said that the plane "violated our airspace from Sudan... and aimed to supply weapons to the terror group, was shot down by our heroic air force". Sudanese army spokesperson Nabil Abdallah stated by phone that Sudan was not involved in the incident. Ethiopian national security advisor Redwan Hussein stated that "the military explained that a plane belonging to historical enemies of our country, who are known for their incessant desire to weaken our country, was shot down."

Reactions and peace process

International
  Saudi Arabia offered to help reconcile the feuding parties.
  British Foreign Secretary Dominic Raab met with officials from both sides and urged them to end their fighting and seek common ground.

Intergovernmental organizations
  Special European Envoy and Finnish Foreign Minister Pekka Haavisto met with Sudanese officials in Khartoum to help reduce tensions between Sudan and Ethiopia. He also met with Ethiopian officials later.

Notes

References

2020 in Ethiopia
2020 in international relations
2020 in Sudan
2021 in Ethiopia
2021 in international relations
2021 in Sudan
Conflicts in 2020
Conflicts in 2021
Conflicts in 2022
Ethiopia–Sudan relations
Territorial disputes of Ethiopia
Territorial disputes of Sudan
Tigray War
Military operations involving Ethiopia
Military operations involving Sudan
Ethiopia–Sudan border